Kot'o station is a railway station in Hwangch'o-rodongjagu, Changjin County, South Hamgyŏng province, North Korea on the Changjin Line of the Korean State Railway. There is a spur from the station to a factory.

History 
The station was opened on 1 November 1934 by the Sinhŭng Railway as part of the second section of its Changjin Line between Samgŏ and Kujin. The Sinhŭng Railway was bought and absorbed by the Chosen Railway on 22 April 1938.

References

Railway stations in North Korea